Rainier is a city in Columbia County, Oregon, United States. The city's population was 1,895 at the 2010 census.  Rainier is on the south bank of the Columbia River across from Kelso and Longview, Washington.

History
Rainier was founded in 1851 on the south bank of the Columbia River by Charles E. Fox, the town's first postman. First called Eminence, its name was later changed to Fox's Landing and finally to Rainier. The name Rainier was taken from Mount Rainier in Washington, which can be seen from hills above the city.  Rainier was incorporated in 1881.

For much of the last quarter of the twentieth century, Rainier was known to the rest of Oregon as home to Trojan Nuclear Power Plant, the only commercial nuclear reactor in the state, which supplied electricity to Portland and its suburbs starting in March 1976.  The reactor was closed periodically due to structural problems, and in January 1993, it was decommissioned after cracks developed in the steam tubes. On May 21, 2006, the cooling tower was demolished.

The closing of the Trojan plant precipitated a decline in the number of businesses in the city.  While some retail and services are available in the city, currently the only supermarket in the city is a Grocery Outlet.  Services are available in neighboring Clatskanie, St. Helens, and in Longview, Washington. Longview is opposite Rainier, across the Columbia River, and connected to Rainier by the Lewis and Clark Bridge.

Geography

Rainier is surrounded by a number of rural communities. In the past, these places acted as separate communities. Today, most businesses and services have left these rural sites, and the communities are part of a large unincorporated area that receive services out of Rainier. These communities include Fern Hill, Hudson, Alston, Apiary, Goble, and Prescott. Except for Prescott, which is an incorporated city (despite having neither a post office nor a separate telephone exchange), little remains to identify these places today other than leftover identifying signs or historic landmarks, such as abandoned or converted school buildings. Residents here may say they live in Rainier or will alternatively use the name of the individual community. 

The Lewis and Clark Bridge spans the Columbia River, linking Rainier to Longview, Washington. It is the only bridge, that spans the entire width of the river, between Portland and Astoria, Oregon.

Demographics

2010 census
As of the census of 2010, there were 1,895 people, 818 households, and 502 families living in the city. The racial makeup of the city was 93.1% White, 0.2% African American, 1.3% Native American, 0.2% Asian, 0.1% Pacific Islander, 1.5% from other races, and 3.6% from two or more races. Hispanic or Latino of any race were 4.0% of the population.

There were 818 households, of which 26.2% had children under the age of 18 living with them, 46.8% were married couples living together, 10.9% had a female householder with no husband present, 3.7% had a male householder with no wife present, and 38.6% were non-families. 32.3% of all households were made up of individuals, and 12.7% had someone living alone who was 65 years of age or older. The average household size was 2.32 and the average family size was 2.91.

The median age in the city was 34.9 years. 21.8% of residents were under the age of 18; 7% were between the ages of 18 and 24; 22.8% were from 25 to 44; 30.4% were from 45 to 64; and 17.9% were 65 years of age or older. The gender makeup of the city was 48.5% male and 51.5% female.

2000 census
As of the census of 2000, there were 1,687 people, 667 households, and 460 families living in the city. The population density was 1,044.8 people per square mile (404.6/km). There were 733 housing units at an average density of 453.9 per square mile (175.8/km). The racial makeup of the city was 92.83% White, 0.06% African American, 1.48% Native American, 0.36% Asian, 0.24% Pacific Islander, 1.36% from other races, and 3.68% from two or more races. Hispanic or Latino of any race were 2.85% of the population. 24.1% were of German, 11.3% Irish and 11.0% English ancestry according to Census 2000.

There were 667 households, out of which 31.2% had children under the age of 18 living with them, 55.3% were married couples living together, 10.2% had a female householder with no husband present, and 31.0% were non-families. 26.4% of all households were made up of individuals, and 9.0% had someone living alone who was 65 years of age or older. The average household size was 2.53 and the average family size was 3.03.

In the city, the population was spread out, with 27.0% under the age of 18, 8.1% from 18 to 24, 25.8% from 25 to 44, 26.1% from 45 to 64, and 13.0% who were 65 years of age or older. The median age was 37 years. For every 100 females, there were 90.2 males. For every 100 females age 18 and over, there were 89.8 males.

The median income for a household in the city was $41,949, and the median income for a family was $46,759. Males had a median income of $45,179 versus $23,036 for females. The per capita income for the city was $18,511. About 8.4% of families and 10.4% of the population were below the poverty line, including 16.9% of those under age 18 and 6.4% of those age 65 or over.

Transportation

Railroad
The Portland and Western Railroad runs through Rainier.  Amtrak passenger rail service is available across the Columbia River in Kelso at the Kelso Multimodal Transportation Center.

Ocean shipping 
In 2005, Teevin Terminal, a barge terminal, opened in Rainier, directly across the Columbia from the Port of Longview in Washington. The Oregon Transportation Commission awarded Teevin Bros. a grant of more than $2 million in 2012  to build a "T-pier," helping Teevin Terminal become "the largest shipper on the Portland & Western  line between Eugene and Astoria," according to owner Shawn Teevin.

Notable people
 Miller M. Duris, politician
Nellie Owens (Little House on the Prairies Nellie Oleson's archetype), lived here with her husband and children
Sage Sharp, software engineer
Kenneth Schrieber, P-61 Black Widow pilot, WW2. Played a critical role in the US Army Rangers raid on the Cabanatuan POW Camp in the Philippines

References

External links

Entry for Rainier in the Oregon Blue Book
Rainier history from Vannatta Bros. Logging

Cities in Oregon
Cities in Columbia County, Oregon
Oregon populated places on the Columbia River
Populated places established in 1851
1851 establishments in Oregon Territory